Chiniot  is a tehsil of Chiniot District in the Punjab province of Pakistan.

Prior to February 2009 Chiniot District and tehsil were part of Jhang District, the tehsil was subdivided into 44 Union Councils.

References

Chiniot District
Tehsils of Punjab, Pakistan